Srirampur railway station is a halt railway station of Bankura–Masagram line under the Adra railway division of South Eastern Railway zone. It is situated beside Sonamukhi Main Road, Mathuraberia at Srirampur in Bankura district in the Indian state of West Bengal.

History 
Old narrow-gauge Bankura–Damodar Railway (also called as Bankura Damodar River Railway) connecting Bankura and Rainagar in Bankura and Bardhaman districts was opened to traffic in sections between 1916 and 1917. In 2005, the 118 kilometers long railway section known as Bankura–Masagram line was converted to  broad gauge. The whole track including Srirampur railway station was electrified in 2018–19.

References

Railway stations in Bankura district
Adra railway division